Bagrat Konstantinovich Ioannisiani (born  in Yerevan, Armenia, died 10 December 1985 in Leningrad, Soviet Union) was a Soviet telescope designer of Armenian descent.

He was the chief designer of the BTA-6, one of the largest telescopes in the world. He was awarded the Lenin Prize in 1957.

References

1911 births
1985 deaths
Armenian engineers
Armenian inventors
Armenian scientists
Heroes of Socialist Labour
Lenin Prize winners
Soviet engineers
Soviet inventors